Sebastiania argutidens is a species of flowering plant in the family Euphorbiaceae. It was described in 1912.

References

Plants described in 1912
argutidens